Oxford Stadium is a greyhound racing and speedway venue in Oxford, located in Sandy Lane, Cowley.

Races were historically held every Tuesday, Thursday and Saturday evening with afternoon BAGS (Bookmakers Afternoon Greyhound Service) racing on Friday and Sunday. Race evenings also included Friday evenings at various times throughout the history of the stadium.

Stadium facilities
There was a 350-seater grandstand restaurant overlooking the track, with three executive suites and large general public areas named after some of Oxford's most successful greyhounds Sandwinder, Security Sam, Self Made and Perth Pat. Conference and business facilities were also available. There is a go-karting track enclosed within the speedway track, which is popular among Oxfordshire residents.

Origins
The stadium was constructed in 1938 on the site of a 'flapping' (unregulated) track where owners could turn up and run their greyhounds around an oval on the days selected for racing. The rear wheel of a jacked up motor car was used to drive the lure around the track. The location on Sandy Lane, in Cowley, Oxfordshire is a short walk from the famous Oxford motor factories built by Morris Motors.

The back straight was adjacent to the Great Western Railway Thame Branch line (now the BMW freight line). A main grandstand building was erected and the stadium joined the regulatory governing body of the National Greyhound Racing Club (NGRC). The owner of the land at the time was a Mr Johnson, and he agreed a 99-year lease with Mr Leslie Vernon Calcutt.

Speedway

Speedway was an integral part of the stadium and was run every year from 1939 up to 2008. The team known as the Oxford Cheetahs won the United Kingdom's premier competition five times. They were champions in 1964, 1985, 1986, 1989 and 2001. Speedway returned to Oxford Stadium in 2022 with the Cheetahs competing in the SGB Championship 2022.

Greyhound racing

Opening
The inaugural race night was on 31 March 1939 and the stadium was officially opened by Lord Denham with races over 310, 525 and 735 yards. The track trainers were Bill Davies, Bill Higgins, Paddy Mullins and Mr Preston. The first race was won by Hunting Snipe, the 2-1 favourite.

1940s
During World War II the track closed and reopened on several occasions, but generally raced on Saturday afternoons. In 1941 Leslie Calcutt purchased Irish Grand National winner 'The Gunner' for £400 and the Jack Young trained hurdler won 11 successive open races, drawing in large crowds. In 1943 Dark Tiger won the Trafalgar Cup.

In 1944 a fire destroyed the main stand: it was reported that a newspaper had blown onto a heater. Also in 1944 Winnie of Berrow won the Eclipse Stakes.

The track was described as a good size course with a good run-up to the first bend. The hare system was an 'Inside McWhirter track-less' and race distances were now 290, 455, 500 and 715 yards. There were kennel facilities on site for 132 greyhounds; fees were charged at one guinea per week, i.e. three shillings per day. Amenities included the Oxford Stadium club five shilling enclosure, Oxford Stadium racing club 2s 3d enclosure.

In 1947 Calcutt was appointed as Director of Bristol Greyhound Racing Association Ltd and one year later Narrogar Ann won the Western Two-Year Old Produce Stakes.

1950s
In the summer of 1952 Calcutt fell ill and had to go to hospital for a major operation. Whilst recuperating at Acland nursing home he suffered a relapse and died on 3 August aged just 49. The Bristol Greyhound Racing Association was soon to change their name to Bristol Stadium Ltd and they took control of Oxford following the death of Calcutt. Kensington Perfection won the 1952 British Breeders Produce Stakes Finals at Catford Stadium and Stamford Bridge and the 1953 Eastville Stadium Produce Stakes and Regency.

Owner-trainers were allowed to race their greyhounds at the track; these included Paddy Sweeney, a respected veterinary surgeon. In 1957 Racing Manager John Hare introduced the Two Year Old Produce Stakes. Bill Higgins (10) and Jack Young (9) won the first 19 Oxford trainer championship titles between them from 1939 to 1957. Higgins died in 1958 and was replaced by Joe Farrand for a second spell at Oxford.

1960s

Drum Major II recorded a fiftieth track win in 1961 and in 1964 the Oxfordshire Stakes was introduced. In 1967 Oxford was one of the first four tracks to be awarded an inaugural BAGS (Bookmakers Afternoon Greyhound Service) contract along with Hackney, Kings Heath and Park Royal. The decade ended with new investment which saw a new supporters club building constructed, it would be used for functions.

1970s
Perth Pat trained by Jim Morgan brought the first ever classic race success to Oxford following her win in the 1970 Oaks. In the same year Henry Kibble secured a tenth track trainers title. In 1974 a new 'Outside Sumner' hare system was introduced but the following year Bristol Stadium Ltd agreed a deal worth £235,000 with the Oxford City Council housing committee. A group formed SOS (Save Our Stadium) and a petition with 27,000 names was lodged with the council. Local MP Michael Heseltine called for a public meeting which gave SOS the chance to find a buyer. The stadium closed on 31 December 1975 until further notice but reopened during March 1976 and eventually found a buyer in 1977 when Northern Sports purchased the track for £250,000. The threat of permanent closure had been prevented by David Hawkins the managing director of Northern Sports.

1980s
The resident kennels were demolished in 1980 because the contract trainers were now employed and one of the trainers called Jack Coker reached the final of the 1980 English Greyhound Derby with Young Breeze. In 1981 Careless Dragon trained by Jim Morgan won the Trafalgar Cup one year before Northern Sports announced plans to invest heavily into Oxford and sister track Ramsgate Stadium. Mick Wheble arrived as Racing Manager in 1984, Joe Farrand retired after 45 years as a trainer and Arthur Hitch won the 1984 BBC TV Trophy with Weston Prelude.

The investment promised came to fruition in 1986 when Northern Sports spent £1.5 million on a new three tier grandstand restaurant and sports centre including squash courts, a snooker club, gymnasium, sauna and various other facilities. The stadium underwent considerable success with significant increases in attendances and totalisator turnover. Charity events featured appearances from Desert Orchid, Bob Champion, Henry Cooper, Jenny Pitman and many others. The sports leading trainer Geoff De Mulder joined the track and the speedway team became the leading team in the United Kingdom with four times World Champion Hans Nielsen as their captain.

In 1987 Sandwinder trained by Vicky Holloway became the track champion and in 1988 the Pall Mall Stakes was switched from the closing Harringay Stadium to Oxford. The first running was won by Fearless Ace and the winning trophy was presented by George Best. As the 1980s ended Maurice Massey won a fifth trainers track title.

1990s
The recent success had made Oxford one of the leading provincial tracks in the UK and the first ever Derby success came in 1994 when Ringa Hustle trained by Tony Meek won the 1994 English Greyhound Derby. Kind of Magic won the 1993 Scurry Gold Cup for Litzi Miller who herself would win eight trainers titles.

However, as the 90s progressed Northern Sports parent company Hawkins of Harrow were beginning to suffer from the recession that was affecting their other business interests in construction and garden centres and in 1995 Hawkins of Harrow called in the receivers and Oxford was made a going concern. The stadium attracted a list of potential buyers but it was Donald Joyce a former member of SOS who purchased the stadium in 1996 and then sold it on for a considerable profit to the Greyhound Racing Association (GRA) in 1999.

2000-2012
The GRA made immediate changes with a new multimillion-pound extension completed during 2000. The old supporters club had been demolished making way for an extension to the grandstand restaurant and addition of three large executive suites. In addition there was a new racing surface and Swaffham hare system costing a further £130,000. The circumference of the track remained at 395 metres, with race distances of 250, 450, 595, 645 and 845 metres.

A classic race called the Cesarewitch switched to Oxford from Catford in 2001 and the major competitions were screened live on SKY television. Angie Kibble won six trainers titles and traditional boxing day meetings continued to draw in a capacity attendance from the local population. The stadium continued to be frequented by the famous which included Ant & Dec, Zara Phillips and Vinnie Jones.

Closure 2012-2020
The closure of the stadium was sealed when GRA's parent company Wembley plc was broken apart and GRA were subject to a takeover by Risk Capital Partners with development partner Galliard Homes in 2005 for £52.4m. Plans for 150 houses and 75 flats were mooted but the council publicly stated they were in favour of keeping the site for leisure use. The racing continued for seven years until the GRA closed the stadium; the last greyhound meeting was held on 29 December 2012 in front of a capacity crowd, with the last winner being Moorstown Mystiq, trained by Richard Baker.

Reopening
The stadium reopened on Wednesday 13 April 2022 with a speedway meeting. Greyhound racing recommenced on Friday 2 September 2022.

Competitions
During the year there were five main greyhound events held at Oxford up until the end of 2012, they were -

The prestigious Pall Mall Stakes (450 m)
The original classic race The Cesarewitch (645 m)
The Trafalgar Cup for puppies (450 m)
The Oxfordshire Stakes (Greyhounds) (450 m)
The Oxfordshire Gold Cup (450 m)
The Two Year Old Produce Stakes (450 m - discontinued in 1975).

Track records at closing

Track records pre-metric

+After the introduction of ray timing

Track records post-metric

Track Dimensions
 NE bend 108 metres
 SE straight 81 metres
 SW bend 109 metres
 NW straight 81 metres
 Total 379 metres

References

Greyhound racing venues in the United Kingdom
Speedway venues in England
Sports venues in Oxford
Sports venues completed in 1939